Anthony 'Tony' Hewson  (born Sheffield, England, 26 January 1934 - died October 2020) was a British racing cyclist who rode the Tour de France and, as an amateur, won the Tour of Britain in 1955. He was critical of the way, as he saw it, British cycling has been let down by its administrators.

Background
Hewson started cycling at 13 when his elder brother, John, asked him for a ride into Derbyshire. He had a heavy bicycle with a Sturmey-Archer hub gear, whereas his brother was already racing with Sheffield Central cycling club. He said:

Amateur career
He joined a racing club affiliated to the British League of Racing Cyclists, an organisation set up to introduce massed racing on the open road. He became national junior road champion in 1951, a year in which he won three races and came second in five others.

He continued racing during national service from 1952 to 1954. He won the Viking Trophy race in the Isle of Man in 1954 and the fifth stage of the Circuit of Britain, alternative to the Tour of Britain. He won the Tour of Britain and the Tour of Scotland in 1955.

Semi-professional career
Hewson became an independent, or semi-professional in 1957, racing in Britain, Belgium and France . He said:

He, John Andrews and Vic Sutton returned to the Côte d'Azur in February 1958, living in an old ambulance bought for £75. It became a chicken house the following season. In 1959 Hewson rode the Tour de France. He started ill-prepared after a six-week chest infection. He said:

On stage seven, to La Rochelle, Hewson was told to wait for a team-mate, Retwig, riding with him in an international team. Retwig had punctured.

Hewson and Sutton were taken on in 1960 by the Liberia-Grammont professional team led by Henry Anglade, but still riding as independents. Sutton described the venture as a short-lived disaster 
which reached its low when he brought down half the team when he fell on loose gravel on a bend – "for which I was blamed entirely."

Demoralisation set in and Hewson decided to quit. He was asked to join another team for the Tour de France but declined.

Retirement and assessment
Hewson stopped racing when he was 26. He said: "I felt surprisingly old and wanted to seize other opportunities before it became too late. I knew I had other talents outside the sporting field waiting to be exploited. I had neither the ability, health nor luck to ride much higher in the sphere of cycle racing."

Ramon Minovi, writing for the Association of British Cycling Coaches, said:
Neither Sutton nor Andrews really lived up to their talent, either. All three could have achieved so much more in cycle racing: Andrews finished 13th in the world road championship, Sutton's climbing prowess was praised by Coppi. The reasons why riders like this seemed unable to capitalise on their talents and achievements are complex, but much of it has to do with the British handicap (in road racing) of starting not at the bottom of the ladder, but miles away from it. Despite his abilities (a Tour of Britain win, a finish in the Peace Race, wins and places all over France) you feel that Hewson was never going to make a long career of it. He seems not to have had the robust constitution which Sean Yates insists is essential to withstand the enormous work-load of professional road racing. It's no surprise when he tells his mate, 'I just keep thinking how hard it is.'

Hewson remained bitter about the way British cycling had abandoned massed racing and the infighting between the British League of Racing Cyclists and the National Cyclists Union that followed its return. He said:

After retiring from cycling, Hewson studied English Language at the University of Leeds, graduating in 1966.

In November 2014, Hewson suffered serious head injuries when he was knocked down by a car whilst riding near his home in Shropshire.  He was never able to ride his bike again and died of a spontaneous sudden brain haemorrhage on 29 September 2020 (possibly attributable to his 2014 accident head trauma) in Hereford hospital, leaving behind a wife and two grown-up children. As part of his legacy, Tony Hewson wrote two successful books about his racing career and cycling short stories.

References

External links
www.tonyhewson.com

1934 births
2020 deaths
Cyclists from Yorkshire
Sportspeople from Sheffield
Alumni of the University of Leeds
Military personnel from Sheffield
20th-century British military personnel